Leptosporina is a fungal genus  in the class Sordariomycetes. The relationship of this taxon to other taxa in the class is unknown (incertae sedis). The genus is monotypic, containing the single species Leptosporina aciculospora, described as new to science in 1939 by Puerto Rican mycologist Carlos E. Chardón.

References

Monotypic Sordariomycetes genera
Sordariomycetes enigmatic taxa